Harini is a former actress in the Kannada cinema. She was active during the 1950s and 1960s, retiring at the peak of her career. As of 2006 she lived in Bangalore.

Early life
Harini was born to Srinivasa Upadhya and Bharathi in Udupi as their fourth child. Her brother Vadiraj was also an actor and producer. She appeared as a child artist in films like Sri Murugan and Kannika for which she received one rupee for delivering the dialogues very nicely. She became a full-fledged heroine through Tamil film Punyavathi.

Career

Harini made her debut as leading lady in Jaganmohini in the role of Mohini at the age of 15. She was the first heroine to wear a swimsuit on the Kannada film screen. The film became a silver jubilee hit and made Harini an overnight star. Harini got 200 letters for her stellar performance when she was shooting for her second film, bilingual Ratnadeep made simultaneously in Tamil and Hindi.

From thereon Harini played a variety of roles in Dallali, Vichitra Prapancha, Nandi, Nanda Deepa, Kanya Dana, Gandharva Kanya and Pathivratha, among other films. Harini acted with many stars of her time, including Dr. Rajkumar, with whom she acted in more than 10 films, Kalyan Kumar, and Udaykumar. Harini has received best actress awards for Nanda Deepa and Mangala Muhurtha.

Sathi Sukanya, released in 1968, was her last film. Harini got married in 1972, moved to Saudi Arabia, and stayed there for 12 years.

Apart from acting, Harini has tried her hand in film production too. Along with her brothers Vadiraj-Jawahar she has produced some meaningful films under the banners of Sri Bharathi Chitra and Vijaya Bharathi. Some of the films produced by Harini are Naandi, Nanda Deepa, Nava Jeevana, Namma Makkalu, and Seetha.

Awards
 2015 - Dr. Rajkumar Award by the Karnataka Government.
 2010 - Padmabhushan Dr. B. Saroja Devi National Award by Bharathiya Vidya Bhavan.
1969 - Filmfare Award for Best Film – Kannada for Namma Makkalu

Filmography

References

External links
 

Actresses in Kannada cinema
Indian film actresses
Tulu people
People from Udupi
Living people
Child actresses in Kannada cinema
20th-century Indian actresses
Actresses from Karnataka
Indian women film producers
Kannada film producers
Film producers from Karnataka
Businesswomen from Karnataka
Recipients of the Rajyotsava Award 2004
Year of birth missing (living people)